Moersdorf is a small town in the commune of Mompach, in eastern Luxembourg.  , the town has a population of 293. It is often called the “little Switzerland of Luxembourg” by residents and tourists alike.

Mompach
Towns in Luxembourg